Kathleen Alice Callaghan (born March 24, 1962) is an American former handball player. She was a member of the United States women's national handball team that played in the Women's tournament at the 1988 Summer Olympics. She coached the women's USAFA Team Handball team and won the 1988 College Nationals title.

Honors
DC Touchdown Club:
1986 Armed Forces Female Athlete of The Year.

See also
 USAFA Team Handball

References

1962 births
Living people
American female handball players
Olympic handball players of the United States
Handball players at the 1988 Summer Olympics
Air Force Falcons team handball
Pan American Games medalists in handball
Pan American Games gold medalists for the United States
Handball players at the 1987 Pan American Games
Medalists at the 1987 Pan American Games
21st-century American women